Michigan has an estimated per capita income of $27,549 and median household income of $50,803

Michigan counties by per capita income

Note: Data is from the 2010 United States Census Data and the 2006-2010 American Community Survey 5-Year Estimates.

References

Michigan

Income
income